Mesoginella is a genus of sea snails, marine gastropod mollusks in the family Marginellidae, the margin snails.

Species
According to the World Register of Marine Species (WoRMS), the following species are included within the genus Mesoginella :
 Mesoginella altilabra (May, 1911)
 Mesoginella aupouria (Powell, 1937)
 Mesoginella australis (Hinds, 1844)
 Mesoginella beecheyi Cossignani, 2006
 Mesoginella brachia (Watson, 1886)
 Mesoginella caducocincta (May, 1916)
 Mesoginella consobrina (May, 1911)
 Mesoginella cracens (Dell, 1956)
 Mesoginella ergastula (Dell, 1953)
 Mesoginella gabrieli (May, 1911)
 Mesoginella inconspicua (G.B. Sowerby, 1846)
 Mesoginella judithae (Dell, 1956)
 Mesoginella koma Marshall, 2004
 Mesoginella larochei (Powell, 1932)
 Mesoginella manawatawhia (Powell, 1937)
 Mesoginella modulata (Laseron, 1957)
 Mesoginella olivella (Reeve, 1865)
 Mesoginella otagoensis (Dell, 1956)
 Mesoginella pisinna Marshall, 2004
 Mesoginella punicea (Laseron, 1948)
 Mesoginella pygmaea (G.B. Sowerby, 1846)
 Mesoginella pygmaeiformis (Powell, 1937)
 Mesoginella pygmaeoides (Singleton, 1937)
 Mesoginella schoutanica (May, 1913)
 Mesoginella sinapi (Laseron, 1948)
 Mesoginella stilla (Hedley, 1903)
 Mesoginella strangei (Angas, 1877)
 Mesoginella tryphenensis (Powell, 1932)
 Mesoginella turbinata (G.B. Sowerby, II 1846)
 Mesoginella vailei (Powell, 1932)
 Mesoginella victoriae (Gatliff & Gabriel, 1908)
Species brought into synonymy
 Mesoginella binivitta Laseron, 1948 : synonym of Mesoginella olivella (Reeve, 1865)
 Mesoginella evanida (G.B. Sowerby II, 1846)  : synonym of  Volvarina evanida (G.B. Sowerby II, 1846)
 Mesoginella frequens Laseron, 1948  : synonym of  Mesoginella strangei (Angas, 1877)
 Mesoginella gabrielae (Bozzetti, 1998)  : synonym of  Marginella gabrielae Bozzetti, 1998
 Mesoginella georgiana May, 1915  : synonym of  Austroginella georgiana (May, 1915)
 Mesoginella infelix Jousseaume, 1857  : synonym of  Mesoginella olivella (Reeve, 1865)
 Mesoginella maxilla Laseron, 1957 : synonym of  Mesoginella brachia (Watson, 1886)
 Mesoginella parsobrina (Laseron, 1948)  : synonym of  Mesoginella sinapi (Laseron, 1948)
 Mesoginella parvistriata (Suter, 1908)  : synonym of  Volvarina parvistriata (Suter, 1908)
 Mesoginella patria Cotton, 1949 : synonym of  Mesoginella inconspicua (G.B. Sowerby, 1846)
 Mesoginella pattisoni (Cotton, 1944  : synonym of  Mesoginella turbinata (G.B. Sowerby II, 1846)
 Mesoginella pipire Laseron, 1948  : synonym of  Mesoginella strangei (Angas, 1877)
 Mesoginella plicatula (Suter, 1910)  : synonym of  Volvarina plicatula (Suter, 1910)
 Mesoginella praetermissa May, 1916  : synonym of  Austroginella praetermissa (May, 1916)
 Mesoginella procella May, 1916  : synonym of  Mesoginella olivella (Reeve, 1865)
 Mesoginella pusilla (Laseron, 1948)  : synonym of  Mesoginella turbinata (G.B. Sowerby II, 1846)
 Mesoginella simplex Reeve, 1865  : synonym of  Mesoginella olivella (Reeve, 1865)
 Mesoginella sinuata Laseron, 1948  : synonym of  Mesoginella strangei (Angas, 1877)
 Mesoginella translucida (G.B. Sowerby II, 1846)  : synonym of  Austroginella translucida (G.B. Sowerby II, 1846)
 Mesoginella tropica Laseron, 1957  : synonym of  Mesoginella brachia (Watson, 1886)

References

 Cossignani T. (2006). Marginellidae & Cystiscidae of the World. L'Informatore Piceno. 408pp
 Boyer F. (2008) The genus Serrata Jousseaume, 1875 (Caenogastropoda: Marginellidae) in New Caledonia. In: V. Héros, R.H. Cowie & P. Bouchet (eds), Tropical Deep-Sea Benthos 25. Mémoires du Muséum National d'Histoire Naturelle 196: 389-436. page(s): 393

External links
  Marshall B.A. 2004. New names for four common Marginellidae (Mollusca : Gastropoda) from northern New Zealand. Molluscan Research 24(1): 7-20

Marginellidae